Dwayne Crutchfield (born September 30, 1959 ) is a former professional American football player who played running back for the New York Jets, Houston Oilers, and Los Angeles Rams. He was drafted by the New York Jets in the third round (79th overall) of the 1982 NFL Draft. Throughout the course of his career, he rushed 235 times for 993 yards and 5 touchdowns.

References

1959 births
Living people
American football running backs
Houston Oilers players
Iowa State Cyclones football players
Los Angeles Rams players
New York Jets players
Players of American football from Cincinnati
People from North College Hill, Ohio